Caofeidian  is a land reclamation-converted economic development zone in Bohai Bay located in the eponymous district of Tangshan, Hebei Province, China. 

It hosts a large coal and ore discharging port, which forms one of the prime ports of Northern China, namely (from South to North) Tianjin - Jingtang port - Caofeidian - Qinhuangdao - Yingkou - Bayuquan - Dalian). Caofedian and Jingtang ports are often referred together as Tangshan port, though Tangshan is actually a large inland city away from the shore.

The area is served by the Tangshan–Caofeidian railway.

Location 
The island is 200 km from Beijing, the island spans 60 km2 and is a 2005-listed pilot area for the development of a Recyclable/Circular Economy (Industrial ecology) in China. Huadian Power and PetroChina have some of their energy bases there. The island is expected to have a population of 300,000 by 2010.

Caofeidian is 80 km from Tangshan city centre.

See also 
 Caofeidian District
 Geography of China
 Zhao Yong
 List of islands by area
 List of islands of China

References

External links 
 

Tangshan